An election for President of Israel was held in the Knesset on 24 March 1993, following the end of Chaim Herzog's second five-year term in office.

History
Ezer Weizman, former Israeli Air Force commander and Defense Minister of Israel, ran against Dov Shilansky, a Likud politician. The Knesset elected Weizman, by a majority of 66 to 53 to serve as the next President of Israel. He assumed office on May 13, 1993.

Results

References

President
Presidential elections in Israel
Israel